The Twenty-one Conditions, officially the Conditions of Admission to the Communist International, refer to the conditions, most of which were suggested by Vladimir Lenin, to the adhesion of the socialist parties to the Third International (Comintern) created in 1919. The conditions were formally adopted by the Second Congress of the Comintern in 1920.

Content 
The conditions were:

SFIO congress
During the December 1920 Tours Congress of the French Section of the Workers' International (SFIO), the 21 conditions were rejected although the majority, led by Fernand Loriot, Boris Souvarine, Marcel Cachin, and Ludovic Frossard, adhered to the Third International, creating the French Section of the Communist International (SFIC), which would later take the name of the French Communist Party (PCF).

PSOE congress
At the July 1920 PSOE congress Fernando de los Ríos proposed that the PSOE should join the Communist International only if defined conditions were met. He and Daniel Anguiano were appointed to visit Soviet Russia to discuss membership of the PSOE in the Communist International. Their trip lasted from 17 October to 13 December 1920. While in Moscow de los Ríos met Lenin, who answered a question by de los Ríos about the compatibility between personal freedom and the length of the dictatorship of the proletariat with the often-quoted answer, „Freedom, what for?“. De los Rios, who believed in a Fabian-humanist form of socialism, told his hosts in Russia that the PSOE should have the right to pick and choose from the Twenty-one Conditions, and should be completely independent of Moscow. This was completely unacceptable to the Bolsheviks, who were engaged in an existential struggle in the Russian Civil War.

At the PSOE Extraordinary Congress in April 1921 Anguiano gave a positive report on the Moscow visit and de los Ríos gave a negative report. The congress voted to reject the Twenty-one Conditions demanded by Moscow. Supporters of the Third International left the PSOE and formed the Spanish Communist Workers Party, which combined with the Spanish Communist Party to form the Communist Party of Spain.

See also 

Communist International
Fourth International
Fifth International

References

Comintern
Vladimir Lenin